The 64th Regiment United States Colored Troops was a U.S.C.T. infantry regiment in the Union Army during the American Civil War. It was organized from the 7th Louisiana Infantry (African Descent) in March 1864. It served in various garrison duties in Mississippi until it was mustered out on March 13, 1866.

See also
List of United States Colored Troops Civil War units

Sources
Civil War Archives

United States Colored Troops Civil War units and formations
Military units and formations established in 1864
1864 establishments in Louisiana
Military units and formations disestablished in 1866